George Barrett may refer to:

 George Barrett (actuary) (1752–1821), English actuary
 George Barrett (jockey) (1863–1898), English jockey
 George W. Barrett ( 1881–1936), American murderer
 George F. Barrett (1907–1980), Illinois Attorney General
 George S. Barrett, American business executive in the health care industry
 George W. Barrett (bishop) (1908–2000), American bishop
 George C. Barrett, Irish-American lawyer and judge from New York

See also 
 George Barret (disambiguation)